Paulasquama callis is a species of suckermouth armored catfish known only from northwestern Guyana where it was collected from the Waruma River which flows into the Mazaruni River. It is the only recognized species in its genus. This species grows to a length of  SL.

References
 

Loricariidae
Monotypic fish genera
Fish of South America
Vertebrates of Guyana
Fish described in 2011